Celda Klouček, born Celestýn Klouček (6 December 1855, Senomaty – 14 October 1935, Prague) was a Czech sculptor, designer, teacher, and paleontologist.

Life and work
He began his studies at the Academy of Arts, Architecture and Design in Prague, then transferred to the School of Applied Arts in Vienna. In addition to his studio work, he taught decorative sculpting at the Kunstgewerbeschule in Frankfurt. From 1888 to 1916, he was a professor at his alma mater in Prague; overseeing a studio for decorative drawing and modeling. He was also involved in the ceramics studio, and worked together with Professor Emanuel Novák (1866-1918), in the Academy's artistic metal program.

Since he was a young boy, he had collected minerals and fossils. Through his own studies, and collaborations with the paleontologists at the National Museum, he developed into a knowledgeable researcher; publishing his own discoveries in the professional journals.

His works were mostly decorative and ornamental pieces, done in bas-relief. They are largely within the style of Historicism, primarily Renaissance and Baroque. He also designed stucco pieces for interiors and exteriors, fireplace masks and lamps, as well as other arts and crafts items. Around 1900, he began designing in the Art Nouveau style and exhibited at the Exposition Universelle in Paris. After World War I, he went into semi-retirement, taking only small, private, commissions.

Selected projects

His works, and works by his students, based on his designs, have been preserved throughout Prague, Plzeň, and Vienna.

 Building of the former Zemská Banka, by Osvald Polívka
 Building of the former Prague Municipal Credit Union, by Antonín Wiehl
 Head office of the Prague Credit Bank
 , today the seat of the Apostolic Nunciature.
 Decorations in the Imperial Suites at the Hofburg.

Sources
 Celda Klouček, sochař, návrhář, paleontolog: Exhibition catalog for his 155th anniversary, West Bohemian Museum, Plzeň, 2010
 Jaroslav Perner, Celda Klouček paleontolog, Prague, 1937 (Online)

External links

 Works by and about Klouček @ the National Library of the Czech Republic
 Mgr. Bronislava Bubeníčková: Přínos Celdy Kloučka české keramické tvorbě na přelomu 19. a 20 (The Contribution of Celda Klouček to Czech Ceramic Art at the Turn of the 19th and 20th Centuries), Bachelor's thesis (2010) @ MUNI, Brno
 Entry for Klouček @ AbART

1855 births
1935 deaths
Czech sculptors
Czech architectural sculptors
Czech paleontologists
People from Rakovník District
Academy of Arts, Architecture and Design in Prague alumni